Fifth Third Center, formally known as the IJL Financial Center and 201 North Tryon, is a  building in Charlotte, North Carolina. It was completed in 1997, and has 30 floors. It is located at the intersection of West Fifth Street and North Tryon Street.  It was designed by Smallwood, Reynolds, Stewart, Stewart & Associates. The building contains  of rentable floor space and it includes an attached 1,030 space parking deck. In 2001 the building won the BOMA International's TOBY award for excellence in office building management and operations.

History 
The building was developed by Trammel Crow Co. for the former NationsBank now Bank of America. After Interstate/Johnson Lane signed on as a tenant the bank agreed to give them naming rights which gave the tower the name IJL Financial Center. In the spring of 1998 260 Interstate/Johnson Lane employees moved into the building to occupy their new headquarters. They moved from their previous headquarters at 121 West Trade, at that time called the Interstate Tower. The building had three restaurants The Capital Grill (opened in spring 1998), CoCo Pazzo (opened in the summer of 1998), and Leo's Delicatessen (opened in the spring of 1998) across . In November 1997 it was announced that Bank of America would occupy  in the building. Additional employees moved in in the spring of 1998.

In October 1998 Wachovia purchased Interstate/Johnson Lane Inc. for $230 million. On March 10, 2010, Fifth Third Bank announced that 201 North Tryon will be the North Carolina headquarters for the bank; renaming it to Fifth Third Center. Previously the building was known as IJL Financial Center. The signage on the building was replaced in May 2010. Fifth Third began to occupy the building in June 2010. They moved their 250 local employees into space that spanned three floors. At the time they moved into the space Bob James, bank president for North Carolina, said that they only had room for 10 additional employees. At that time there was an option to lease a fourth floor. Their previous Charlotte office was in University Research Park. The bank first entered the Charlotte market with their 2008 acquisition of First Charter Corp. First Charter had occupied a small amount of space in the building.

In July 2012 Real estate investment firm Parmenter Realty Partners purchased the building from Bank of America for $163 million, which came out to $240 per square foot.  This price per square foot was similar to other recent transactions in Charlotte.  In June 2012 Parkway properties paid for $257 per square foot for Truist Center formerly Hearst Tower for a total of $250 million and also in June an Israeli real estate firm purchased One Wells Fargo Center for $249 per square foot for a total of $245 million. At the time of the purchase the building was 99% leased.  This sale was part of a broader effort by Bank of America to sell the building along with Truist Center formerly Hearst Tower.  The bank leased back space in both buildings.

The firm is the third largest tenant after Bank of America and Fifth Third. In March 2015 HFF Inc. signed a lease for 6,000 square feet.

In June 2014 Cousins Properties purchased the building for $215 million, which equals $308 pers square foot.  This transaction set the record for the highest price per square foot for an office building.  The previous record was from 2007 when the Carillon building was purchased for $140 million, with a price of $298 per square foot.

Tenant Dimensional Fund Advisors vacated two floors earlier in 2019, which they occupied starting in 2015, to occupy its newly built East Coast headquarters in South End. In 2019 Fifth Third had 500 employees based in the Charlotte area with plans to add an additional 300 in the coming years.

See also
 List of tallest buildings in Charlotte
List of tallest buildings in North Carolina

External links

 Official site
 Emporis

References

Skyscraper office buildings in Charlotte, North Carolina
Office buildings completed in 1997